The Old Bridge of Dezful is located near the city of Dezful in South Western Iran. This bridge connects the western and eastern part of the city of Dezful.

History
The design of the bridge in its current state is 1700 years old and goes back to the Sassanid dynasty, however the original foundation of the bridge was built during the Elamite era.
The current bridge was built by the order of the Sassanid king, Shapur I, using seventy thousand Roman prisoners of war. The bridge has been repaired and rebuilt over the years by King 'Adud al-Dawla, Saffavid and Pahlavi dynasties.

Since year 2010, motor vehicles are no longer permitted to use the bridge, because of its historic value.

Gallery

See also 
 Alcántara Bridge
 List of Roman bridges

References

External links
 http://www.pbase.com/k_amj/dezful

Bridges in Iran
Roman bridges
Deck arch bridges
Stone bridges
Bridges completed in the 3rd century